Tourism in Pakistan is a growing industry. In 2010, Lonely Planet termed Pakistan "tourism's 'next big thing' for more years than we care to remember". The country is geographically and ethnically diverse, and has a number of historical and cultural heritage sites. Condé Nast Traveller ranked Pakistan The Best Holiday Destination for 2020 and also declared it the third-highest potential adventure destination in the world for 2020. As security in the country improves, tourism increases; in two years, it has increased by more than 300%. The Pakistani government had launched online visa services for 175 countries and 50 countries were offered visa on arrival, making a visit to Pakistan easier. The country received an influx of travel vloggers, who promoted the characteristics of the country, such as in the Northern Pakistan, like Hunza and Skardu.

In 2018, the British Backpacker Society ranked Pakistan the world's top adventure travel destination, describing the country as "one of the friendliest countries on earth, with mountain scenery that is beyond anyone's wildest imagination". Forbes ranked Pakistan as one of the ‘coolest places’ to visit in 2019. The World Economic Forum's Travel & Tourism Competitiveness Report placed Pakistan in the top 25 per cent of global destinations for its World Heritage Sites, which range from the mangroves in the Indus delta to the Indus Valley civilization sites including Mohenjo-daro and Harappa.

According to the World Economic Forum's Travel and Tourism Competitiveness Report 2017, the direct contribution of travel and tourism to Pakistan's GDP in 2015 was US$328.3 million, constituting 2.8% of the total GDP. By 2025, the government predicts tourism will contribute  to the Pakistani economy.

In October 2006, one year after the 2005 Kashmir earthquake, The Guardian released a list of "the top five tourist sites in Pakistan" to help the country's tourism industry. The sites included Lahore, the Karakoram Highway, Karimabad and Lake Saiful Muluk. To promote the country's cultural heritage, in 2007, Pakistan launched the "Visit Pakistan" marketing campaign that involved events including fairs, religious festivals, regional sporting events, arts and craft shows, folk festivals and openings of historical museums.

In 2013, over half a million tourists visited Pakistan, contributing $298 million; these figures have since risen to over 6.6 million tourists in 2018. By comparison, Pakistan's domestic tourism industry is estimated at 50 million tourists who travel in the country on short trips usually between May to August. The largest inflow of tourists are from the United Kingdom, followed by United States, India and China.

Overview 

Major tourist attractions in Pakistan include the ruin of Mohenjo-daro and Harappa, the Himalayan hill stations. The north of Pakistan has many old fortresses, ancient architecture and the Hunza and Chitral valleys, which are home to small Kalash communities and Fairy Meadows, and the Diamer District of Gilgit Baltistan. Punjab province has the historic city Lahore, Pakistan's cultural capital, with many examples of Mughal architecture such as Badshahi Masjid, Shalimar Gardens, Tomb of Jahangir and Lahore Fort.

Along with Afghanistan Pakistan continues to be on extended international travel restrictions advisory of WHO due to yet to be achieved satisfactory level of polio immunization and concern of international spread of the polio decease again.

According to Samira Shackle, Pakistan during the 1960s was part of the famous “hippy trail” stretching from Europe to Asia. But that tourism disappeared in the 1970s with the conversion from a liberal government to an Islamized Pakistan under dictator Muhammad Zia-ul-Haq. Due to subsequent Taliban and al-Qaeda influence, especially after the September 11 attacks, westerners became the target of local branches of those terror organizations. Shackle says even domestic tourism came to a halt due to terrorism which - as of 2018 - has taken the lives of more than 65,000 in Pakistan since the year 2001.

Image and influencers 
The upsurge in tourism in the past few years has been aided by the Government of Pakistan's recent decision to end mandatory No Objection Certificates for foreign tourists seeking to visit certain parts of the country. According to Samira Shackle, since 2018 one estate dealing company promoting Gwadar properties as new Dubai started organizing visits for travel influencers. Shackle says, lately Pakistan has become an unexpected destination for western social media influencers producing glossy, upbeat travel content. Travel influencers popular on social media like Rosie Gabrielle, Food Ranger, Drew Binsky too were roped in image building for Pakistan tourism. Shackle says, under Prime Minister Imran Khan, the Government of Pakistan has encouraged this tourism. For 2020 Forbes listed in top ten tourist destinations where as Condé Nast Traveller went ahead to rank Pakistan on first number as a tourist destination. Shackle says, while some Pakistanis find pride in recruited influencer driven image making, many other Pakistanis are bewildered. While on one hand Pakistan is being promoted as ideal destination, any one from civil society presenting critical narrative are bulldozed, even journalist Shackle herself was asked to display only positive sides of Pakistan. According to Shackle some critics believe that promotion of tourism is just mere attempt of deflecting domestic & international attention from realities of terrorism, nuclear irresponsibility, money laundering, lack of democracy and human rights issues in Pakistan.

Shackle maintains that the influencers are accused of parroting Pakistan government's points. But as per Zayer Hussain, Government of Pakistan is not pushy about what travel influencers speak, but only if any thing bad is spoken travel permits are refused to travel influencers. Shackle says, Pakistan has a 'White (Gora) complex' just a for mere being white traveler Pakistanis are ever ready to provide preferential treatment along with free mass media and social media exposure. One travel influencer Alex Reynolds admits to Shackle that when she was moving with a white boy friend they were offered all kind of privileges when moving around but same privileges did not come by her when she visited alone. In January 2019 Karachi-based one comedian, Shehzad Ghias Shaikh went on to create a hoax Twitter account with name and image pretending to be American woman vlogger by name 'Samantha A Gerry'; within hours twitter handle of 'Samantha A Gerry' received hundreds of messages including from highprofile Pakistanis offering to take care and party. When twitter handle wrote how beautiful Pakistan is along with some anti India sentiment popularity among Pakistani social media enthusiasts increased immediately. According to Amtul Baweja and Fahad Tariq it is okay if foreign tourist vloggers are given good treatment but same treatment is not given to they being even local vloggers.

Many liberals and feminists in Pakistan too express their reservations about misrepresentation of Pakistan's objective reality about status of women in Pakistan by western white travel influencers. During International Women's Day March in Pakistan a placard came questioning, "If Cynthia does it, she's applauded. If I do it, I'm the villain". Cynthia Ritchie is an American travel and Social media influencer who rode a bike in Peshawar, a city in north-western Pakistan, Pakistani women are usually forbidden from cycling because it is seen as immodest, for example bicycle rally by girls in Peshawar was forced to be cancelled, same time Cynthia Ritchie was being applauded, so Pakistan feminists questioned the double standard of Pakistani society. In 2021 March a travel influencer Twitter handle   iKatherineGeorg praised behavior of Pakistani Men No one in the world respects women as much as Pakistani men. Very respectful and humble" and "Pakistan is a country that loves and respects women", but Pakistani feminists on social media wondered and asked her to take them to that Pakistan.

Shackle says just months after influencer Eva Zu Beck's vlogs hotel and bus transport was attacked by terrorists, still she does not seem to address the issue or keep audience informed. According to travel influencer Eva Zu Beck, their vlogs are neither travel guides nor practical pieces of advice but those are just stories, and she declines any obligation to offer security advice saying they are not in that kind of content. According to Shackle one of the travel influncer Cynthia Ritchie went on to embroil herself in Pakistani politics including attacking Pakistani liberals and political opposition. Another travel influencer Alex Reynolds maintains her self to be an adventure tourist.

According to Tazayian Sayira (2022) study, suffered by anthropogenic crisis Pakistan needs image make over from it being known for place of violent conflict and terrorism and Government of Pakistan has lately attempted some repositioning in direction of image makeover. Tazayian Sayira (2022) study says, while Quran encourages traveling, but in practice very trying constraints are placed on participation of women in tourism in Muslim majority countries like Pakistan, like many of them are restrained from traveling without close male relative called mahram (i.e. father, non cousin brother, son), though women are main behind the scene contributors in service provisions like food, laundry, souvenir production, the labour that most times presumed as unpaid  routine family work.

Tourist visas 

In 2019, Pakistan increased the availability of travel visas in a bid to increase tourism to the country. The new program grants visas on arrival to travellers from 50 countries, including the United States. Citizens of another 175 countries can apply for visas on the internet. Previously, visas could only be obtained from Pakistani embassies abroad.

Tourism by province and territory
Pakistan is subdivided into provinces Balochistan, Khyber Pakhtunkhwa, Punjab and Sindh; the federal territory Islamabad Capital Territory; and autonomous regions Azad Jammu and Kashmir and Gilgit-Baltistan.

Gilgit-Baltistan

Gilgit-Baltistan includes some of the highest peaks in the world, including K2, the world's second-highest peak. Gilgit Baltistan's landscape includes mountains, lakes, glaciers and valleys. The province is also visited for its landmarks, culture, history and people. K2 Basecamp, Deosai, Naltar, Fairy Meadows Bagrot Valley and Hushe valley are common tourist destinations in the province.

Balochistan

Balochistan is Pakistan's largest province by area, constituting approximately 43% of the country. Balochistan is home to one of the oldest Neolithic (7000 BC to c. 2500 BC) sites in archaeology. Mehrgarh and Nausharo was an ancient city that is linked to the Indus Valley civilization. Ancient sites dating back 800 years are the Nausherwani tombs at Qila Ladgasht. There was an ancient port at the site of Oraea that was used during the Hellenistic civilisation.

Quetta is the provincial capital of Balochistan. Sites of interest include the protected Hazarganji-Chiltan National Park, Hanna Lake, Quetta Geological Museum, Balochistan Arts Council Library, Quetta Archaeological Museum and Command and Staff College Museum. The Quaid-e-Azam Residency in the city of Ziarat, which is famous for having the world's largest and oldest juniper forests. Sibi is an important historical city in which the Jirga Hall has a collection of pieces that were found at the archaeological sites of Mehrgarh, Nasshero and Pirak. The annual Sibi Festival includes a Horse and Cattle Show.

The province includes a number of mountain passes. The Bolan Pass was the main entrance to the provincial city Quetta; others include Lak Pass, Khojak Pass and Harnai Pass. The city of Gwadar has the largest port in the province and is based near the ancient area Makran. Pasni is a medium-sized town that is known for fishing. Along the Makran Coastal Highway, there are several rock formations, as well as Kund Malir and the Hingol National Park.

Sindh

Sindh is located in south-eastern Pakistan. The province is known for its religious heritage and rapid urbanisation and was home to the ancient Indus Valley civilisation. Mohenjo-daro near the city of Larkana was one of the largest city-settlements in South Asia and is an official UNESCO World Heritage Site. The Chaukhandi tombs are another example of ancient Sindhi and Balochi heritage located near the town of Landi. Another ancient city Aror is located near the city of Sukkur. Kahu-Jo-Darro is an ancient Buddhist archaeological site near Mirpurkhas where a Buddhist stupa was excavated.

The first arrival of Islam in South Asia took place in Karachi. A number of sites within the province have led archaeologists to suggest this. Makli Hill is one of the largest necropolises in the world and is home to a number of ancient tombs and graves of Islamic dynasties. The Talpur Mirs of Hyderabad also left a number of sites including, Tombs of Talpur Mirs, Faiz Mahal in Khairpur, Qasim fort, Pacco Qillo and the Kot Diji Fort in Kot Diji; and the Ranikot Fort was built during the Islam invasion. Sindh has a number of cultural shrines and mausoleums including Thatta, Shah Abdul Latif Bhittai, Lal Shahbaz Qalander, Shahjahan Mosque, Mazar-e-Quaid, Minar-e-Mir Masum Shah, Bhambore and Garhi Khuda Bakhsh.

Karachi is the provincial capital of the province and largest city of Pakistan. It is home to the founder of the nation Mohammad Ali Jinnah, whose tomb at Mazar-e-Quaid is the most iconic mausoleum in Pakistan. The Port of Karachi is the country's largest post followed by the second largest, Port Qasim. The city has a number of cultural sites including Mohatta Palace, National Museum of Pakistan, Empress Market, Frere Hall, Jehangir Kothari Parade, Karachi Municipal Corporation Building and the Hindu Gymkhana. There are several beaches within the city, some of the most famous are Clifton Beach, French Beach, Sandspit Beach and Manora Island.

The province forms the basin of the Indus River and has a number of lakes, including Keenjhar Lake, Manchar Lake and Bakri Waro Lake. Kirthar National Park is a protected reserve for several wildlife species. The Thar Desert is also located in the province which adjoins Punjab and India. The Great Rann of Kutch is a protected wetland site in the province, which has two wildlife sanctuaries; Rann of Kutch Wildlife Sanctuary and the Nara Desert Wildlife Sanctuary. The Sukkur Barrage was built to alleviate famines caused by lack of rain.

Port Grand Food and Entertainment Complex is a recreational area in the centre of Karachi  that was built along the waterfront of the 19th-century Native Jetty Bridge. The complex is expected to attract up to 5,000 visitors a day and is a major hub of shopping, dining, cultural and coastal recreational activities. Port Grand is located on Napier Mole Bridge, which is historically significant to the city, and the 19th-century Native Jetty Bridge.

Khyber Pakhtunkhwa

Khyber Pakhtunkhwa is located in the north-west region of Pakistan and is popular with adventurers and explorers. The province has a varied landscape ranging from rugged mountains, valleys, hills and farms. There are a number of Buddhist archaeological sites from the Gandhara civilisation such as Takht Bhai and Pushkalavati, and other Buddhist and Hindu archaeological sites including Bala Hisar Fort, Butkara Stupa, Kanishka stupa, Chakdara, Panjkora Valley and Sehri Bahlol.

The province's capital city is Peshawar, which is home to a number of sites including Bala Hisar Fort, Peshawar Museum, archaeological site of Gor Khuttree, Mohabbat Khan Mosque, old city of Sethi Mohallah, Jamrud Fort, the Sphola Stupa and the market at Qissa Khwani Bazaar. The city Dera Ismail Khan is known as the entrance into the province from Punjab and Balochistan, and for its Hindu ruins at Kafir Kot. Mardan city has Buddhist ruins at Shahbaz Garhi. 
In the north of the province is the Swat valley One of the most important cities in the province is Mansehra, which a major stop for tourists setting out to the Northern Areas and Azad Kashmir. The city is connected by the Karakoram Highway, which ends in China. Along the route, there are several stops including the Kaghan Valley, Balakot, Naran, Shogran, Lake Saiful Mulook and Babusar Top. There are also several other sites that attract a large number of tourist every year including Ayubia, Batkhela, Chakdara, Saidu Sharif, Kalam Valley and Hindu Kush mountain range in Chitral.

Several mountain passes run through the province. One of the most famous is the Khyber Pass, which links Afghanistan with Pakistan. The trade route sees a large number of trucks and lorries transporting goods in and out of the region. The Babusar Pass connects Thak Nala with Chilas on the Karakorum Highway. The Lowari Pass connects Chitral with Dir via the Lowari Tunnel. The highest mountain pass in Pakistan is the Shandur Pass, which connects Chitral to Gilgit and is known as the "Roof of the World". The pass is the centre of the Hindukush, Pamir and Karakoram ranges.

Punjab

Punjab is the second-largest province in Pakistan. It is known for its ancient cultural heritage and its religious diversity. The Indus Valley civilisation once ruled the region and a significant archaeological find was discovered at the ancient city of Harrapa. The Gandhara civilisation was also dominant at the site of Taxila in the north of Punjab. Several other civilisations such as Greeks, Central Asians and Persians ruled Punjab, leaving a number of sites that still exist today. Islam arrived in the region during the rule of the Umayyad Caliphate followed by the Ghaznavids. The Mughals took control of the region and ruled its land for several centuries. The Mughal heritage remained strong in Punjab with a large number of forts, tombs and monuments sintact today. The Durrani Empire ruled Punjab after the fall of the Mughal Empire for a short period following the rise of the Sikh Empire. The strong control of the Sikhs also left ta number of sites that have remained intact throughout Punjab. The British Raj took control of the region until the independence.

Tourism in Punjab is regulated by the Tourism Development Corporation of Punjab. The province has a number of large cosmopolitan cities, including the provincial capital Lahore. Major visitor attractions there include Lahore Fort and Shalimar Gardens, which are now recognised World Heritage Sites. The Walled City of Lahore, Badshahi Mosque, Wazir Khan Mosque, Tomb of Jahangir and Nur Jahan, Tomb of Asaf Khan, Chauburji and other major sites visited by tourists each year.

Rawalpindi is a famous hill station stop for tourists. The Pharwala Fort, which was built by an ancient Hindu civilisation, is on the outskirts of the city. The city of Sheikhupura also has a number of sites from the Mughal Empire, including the World Heritage-listed Rohtas Fort near Jhelum. The Katasraj temple in the city of Chakwal is a major destination for Hindu devotees. The Khewra Salt Mines is one of the oldest mines in South Asia. Faisalabad's clock tower and eight bazaars were designed to represent the Union Jack.

The province's southward is arid. Multan is known for its mausoleums of saints and Sufi pirs. The Multan Museum and Nuagaza tombs are significant attractions in the city. The city of Bahawalpur is located near the Cholistan and Thar deserts. Derawar Fort in the Cholistan Desert is the site for the annual Cholistan Jeep Rally. The city is also near the ancient site of Uch Sharif which was once a Delhi Sultanate stronghold. The Noor Mahal, Sadiq Ghar Palace, Darbar Mall were built during the reign of the Nawabs. The Lal Suhanra National Park is a major zoological garden on the outskirts of the city.

Azad Kashmir 

Azad Kashmir is situated in northern part of the country. The northern part of Azad Jammu and Kashmir encompasses the lower part of the Himalayas, including Jamgarh Peak . Sarwali peak in the Neelum Valley is the highest peak in the province. Ganga Choti is a peak in Bagh. The province is fertile, green and mountainous.

Islamabad Capital Territory

Islamabad, Pakistan's capital city, is located on the Pothohar Plateau in the north-eastern part of the country between Rawalpindi District and the Margalla Hills National Park to the north. The region has historically been a part of the crossroads of [Punjab and Khyber Pakhtunkhwa with the Margalla Pass acting as the gateway between the two regions. Faisal Mosque (the largest mosque in South Asia, Margalla Hills National Park, Daman-i-Koh, Pakistan Monument, Rawal Lake, Simli Lake and Fatima Jinnah Park are among the tourist attractions in the territory. It is ranked as the second most-beautiful capital city in the world

UNESCO World Heritage Sites

The table lists information about each World Heritage Site in Pakistan.
Name: as listed by the World Heritage Committee
Region: one of the 8 administrative units of Pakistan
Period: time period of significance, typically of construction
UNESCO data: the site's reference number; the year the site was inscribed on the World Heritage List; the criteria it was listed under: criteria (i) through (vi) are cultural, while (vii) through (x) are natural; meeting both criteria are categorized as "mixed sites"
Description: brief description of the site

Tentative list

In 2004, the Ministry of Tourism pushed forward for new sites in Pakistan to become a UNESCO World Heritage Site. In total, 26 sites are awaiting to be categorised as of 2016 which include:

 Badshahi Mosque, Lahore – mosque built in 1673 during Mugal Empire
 Shah Jahan Mosque, Thatta – mosque built in 1647 by Shah Jahan
 Wazir Khan Mosque, Lahore – mosque built in 1635 by Shah Jahan
 Tomb of Jahangir, Tomb of Asif Khan and Akbari Sarai Gateway in Lahore – mausoleum built in 1637
 Tomb of Bibi Jawindi, Baha'al-Halim and Ustead, Mosque of Jalaluddin Bukhari, Uch Sharif – five monuments of historical figures
 Tomb of Shah Rukn-e-Alam, Multan – tomb for Sufi Shah Rukn-e-Alam
 Chaukhandi Tombs, Karachi – tombs built during Mughal Empire
 Central Karakoram National Park – largest protected area in northern Pakistan
 Deosai National Park – a high-altitude alpine plain and a national park in Gilgit-Baltistan
 Hingol National Park – a national park in Balochistan
 Hiran Minar and Tank, Sheikhupura – built by Mughal Emperor, Jahangir in 1606
 Mehrgarh, Balochistan – one of the oldest Neolithic ruins and archaeological sites
 Rehman Dheri, Dera Ismail Khan – historical ruins of Indus Valley civilization
 Harappa, Punjab – historical ruins of the Bronze Age
 Katas Raj Temples – temples near Chakwal which are attributed to Hindu Shahis Eras dating from about 615–950 CE
 Nagarparkar Cultural Landscape – an important center of Jain religion and culture in Sindh
 Mansehra Rock Edicts, Mansehra – earliest writings of the third century BC
 Ranigat, Khyber Pakhtunkhwa – archaeological remains of a Buddhist monastic complex
 Shahbazgarhi Rock Edicts, Mardan – inscriptions of the Mauryan emperor, Ashoka
 Baltit Fort, Hunza Valley – Tibetan-style fort built in the 13th century
 Derawar Fort and the forts of Cholistan Desert – located in Punjab
 Ranikot Fort, Jamshoro District – one of the largest forts in the world
 Port of Banbhore – archaeological site of historical port city on the Indus River
 The Salt Range and Khewra Salt Mine – the second largest and oldest salt mine in the world
 Karez System – in Balochistan
 Ziarat Juniper Forest – a juniper forest in Ziarat, Balochistan

Other landmarks

Other landmarks and structures have not yet made the UNESCO Tentative List. Long before the creation of Pakistan after its partition from India in 1947, there existed diverse cultures and religions in the undivided India. India was the centre of various wars that led to several dynasties and tribes ruling its lands. They left behind landmarks, some of which have become national icons in Pakistan now whilst others need the attention of concerned authorities. Some of these include:

 Altit Fort in Hunza Valley
 Bagrot Valley
 Bala Hissar Fort in Peshawar
 Chaqchan Mosque in Khaplu
 Frere Hall in Karachi
 Khaplu Palace in Khaplu
 Mahabat Khan Mosque-A Mughal Era mosque in Peshawar
 Faisalabad Clock Tower and the Eight Bazaars
 17th- and 18th-century Tombs of Talpur Mirs
 Faiz Mahal of the Talpur Mirs
 Samadhi of Ranjit Singh
 Mughal built the tomb of Asaf Khan at Shahdara Bagh
 Empress Market built during the rule of the British Empire
 The tomb of Qutb-ud-din Aibak, the first Sultan of Delhi and founder of the slave dynasty
 Mohatta Palace, built in 1927
 18th-century Omar Hayat Mahal
 19th-century Italian chateau Noor Palace
 The 3000 BC fort of Kot Diji and Faiz Mahal in Khairpur
 16th-century fort at Skardu
 Nagar Fort at Chitral

Post-independence Pakistan retained its heritage by constructing sites to commemorate its independence by blending styles and influences from the past. Some of these include:

 Minar-e-Pakistan in Lahore
 Grand Jamia Mosque, Lahore
 Faisal Mosque in Islamabad
 The mausoleum of the founder of Pakistan, Mohammad Ali Jinnah
 Bab-e-Pakistan a memorial site for the victims of the independence
 Pakistan Monument in Islamabad
 The mausoleum of Allama Muhammad Iqbal
 The Shrine of Lal Shahbaz Qalandar – Sufi Saint in Sindh
 Gorakh Hill, Dadu – situated on one of the highest plateaus of Sindh

Tourism under Prime Minister Imran Khan
Prime minister Imran Khan planned to boost tourism to create millions of jobs. In his first television address to the nation, he said; "Pakistan has huge tourism potential. We will promote tourism to strengthen the economy". The tourism industry in Pakistan has witnessed a boom as law and order has improved across the country in the last five years. The country of 235 million is known for its hospitality globally.

Military operations launched by Pakistan armed forces during 2013–2017 against militants wiped out terrorism and militancy across the country, especially in northern areas, paving the way for revival of tourism. The Government of Pakistan has also eased the country's visa policy, which has played a key role in attracting a large numbers of foreign tourists. "We are improving processes to issue tourist visas, in particular for groups and champion initiatives, which strengthen our visa on arrival program and eliminate NoC condition for high potential tourist destinations besides providing four-star accommodation at affordable cost", said Fawad Chaudhry, a minister in government. He also said; "peace had been restored and the local and foreign tourists were coming in large numbers to visit the scenic places and heritage sites".

The Imran khan government organised the Pakistan Tourism Summit, which occurred on 2 and 3 April 2019 at Jinnah Convention Centre, Islamabad, and was attended by Prime Minister Khan, Foreign Minister Shah Mehmood Qureshi, Interior Minister Shehryar Afridi, Information Minister Fawad Chaudhry, and some well-known international bloggers, who spoke about their experiences during the panel discussion and answered question from the participants. Due to these measures, 1.9 million tourists visited Pakistan in 2018 and as of 2020, tourism in the country has increased by more than 300%.

List of tourist regions and sites

In October 2006, The Guardian released what it described as "The top five tourist sites in Pakistan". Pakistan was ranked 47 out of 200 countries in an analysis of the World Travel and Tourism Council's (WTTC) growth figures by Lovehomeswap.com, which said, "If the country becomes more peaceful, visitor numbers are predicted to rise".

Ski resorts and areas

Malam Jabba ski resort
Naltar ski resort
Nathia Gali
Shimshal
Rattu
Astore

Valleys

Lakes

Waterfalls

Data

Arrivals by year

1990s

2000s

2010s

Gallery

Gilgit Baltistan

Balochistan

Khyber Pakhtunkhwa

Punjab

Sindh

Azad Kashmir

Islamabad Capital Territory

Visa policy of Pakistan 

Visitors to Pakistan typically must obtain a visa from one of the Pakistani diplomatic missions.

Indians are only eligible for business, pilgrim or Visitor Visas to Pakistan. The pilgrim VISA allows Indians to visit 15 sites in Pakistan for religious tourism – they will be given a visitor visa. The Visitor Visa is granted if you have close family members or friends in Pakistan and you can only visit a maximum of 5 cities for 3 months.

See also 

 Hindu pilgrimage sites in Pakistan
 List of Gurdwaras in Pakistan
 Hindu, Jain and Buddhist architectural heritage of Pakistan
 List of World Heritage sites in Pakistan
 List of cultural heritage sites in Pakistan
 British heritage of Pakistan
 Pakistan Tourism Development Corporation
 Cuisine of Pakistan
 Culture of Pakistan
 Pakistani architecture
 Wildlife of Pakistan
 Sports in Pakistan
 List of forts in Pakistan
 List of mountains in Pakistan
 List of museums in Pakistan
 List of parks and gardens in Pakistan
 Law enforcement in Pakistan
 List of lakes of Pakistan
 List of waterfalls of Pakistan
 List of beaches in Pakistan
 List of deserts of Pakistan
 List of hill stations in Pakistan
 List of rivers of Pakistan
 List of national parks of Pakistan

References

Further reading
"Pakistan a magical tourist destination". The Korea Herald.
 Does crime-tourism nexus hold for Pakistan? ~ Muhammad Ahad, Zaheer Anwer, Wasim Ahmad; International Journal of Emerging Markets ISSN:1746-8809, date: 21 January 2021

External links

eVisa and Visa on Arrival, Government of Pakistan
 Ministry of Tourism, Government of Pakistan
 Sindh Tourism Development Corporation
 Department of Tourism, Government of Khyber Pakhtunkhwa
 Official site, Government of Balochistan
 Department of Tourism, Government of Punjab
 Department of Culture & Tourism, Government of Sindh
 Department of Tourism, Government of Azad Jammu and Kashmir
 Department of Tourism, Government of Gilgit-Baltistan

 
Pakistan